Washermanpet was assembly constituency in Tamil Nadu. The elections conducted in the constituency and winners are listed below. It existed from 1952 to 1971 elections.

Madras State

Election results

1971

1967

1962

1957

1952

References

External links

Former assembly constituencies of Tamil Nadu